Shen Quanqi (c. 650 – 729), also known as Yunqing, was a Chinese poet and government official active during the Tang dynasty, and the interluding "restored Zhou dynasty" of Wu Zetian. Shen Quanqi is especially known for his work in developing and perfecting the regulated verse form of Classical Chinese poetry. Shen's poetry ranges from the elegant court style of the poetry which he wrote while at court and the intensely anguished poems which he wrote during his years of exile, in the extreme south of the empire.

Life
He was born in the prefecture of Neihuang in the province of Xiangzhou, which is known today as the province of Henan.

In 675, Shen Quanqi obtained a magistrate degree. He then served several positions as a scholar at the imperial court, and was appointed by the government official Zhang Yizhi. However, the Wuzhou Dynasty was overthrown, and Zhang Yizhi was executed. Shen Quanqi was arrested and imprisoned on charges of bribery and corruption. He was then released, but sent in exile to Huanzhou of Annan Duhufu, which is known today as Vinh in Vietnam. In 706, he was pardoned, and recalled to resume his duties at the imperial court, where he eventually worked up to the  position of imperial diarist and then grand secretary.

Works
He made numerous contributions to Chinese poetry, including the Five-verse poems. He was also known to write together with poet Song Zhiwen, and the two were known as the "Shen-Song" pair.

Due to his exile to Annan (today known as Vietnam), he wrote numerous poems in the region. Many of his poems written there are some of the earliest literary works concerning Vietnam.

See also
Classical Chinese poetry forms
Regulated verse

Notes

References

External links
 
Books of the Quan Tangshi that include collected poems of Shen Quanqi at the Chinese Text Project:
Book 95
Book 96
Book 97

650s births
729 deaths
Three Hundred Tang Poems poets
Writers from Anyang
Poets from Henan
7th-century Chinese poets
8th-century Chinese poets